A list of French-produced films scheduled for release in 2021.

Films

Notes

External links
 French films of 2021 at the Internet Movie Database

Lists of 2021 films by country or language
2021
Films